Rise is the second studio album by Japanese band Speed. The album was released on 29 April 1998 and  contains the singles "Wake Me Up!", "My Graduation" and their all-time biggest hit, "White Love". The album successfully topped the Oricon sales charts eventually selling 2.09 million copies making it the best selling original studio album by female group in Japan. They later embarked on a summer tour titled "Rise Dome Tour" to promote their album becoming the first female Jpop group ever to complete the dome tour in Japan.

Track listing
 Rise
 Sophisticated Girl
 Another Sweet Field
 Wake Me Up (Rise Mix)
 White Love
 
 Reset 99 to 00
 Brand New Weekend (Varick Street Mix)
  — (Tropical Night)
 Too Young
 My Graduation (Album Version)
 I'll Be Alright
 Street Life

References

Speed (Japanese band) albums
1998 albums
Toy's Factory albums